Cyrtosia septentrionalis is a species of plant in the family Orchidaceae. It is a myco-heterotrophic species found in Japan, Korea, Ryukyu Islands, and China (Anhui, Henan, Hunan, and Zhejiang).

References

 Bot. Mus. Leafl. Harvard Univ. 30(4): 233 (1986).

External links 
 Cyrtosia septentrionalis

Myco-heterotrophic orchids
Orchids of Japan
Orchids of China
Orchids of Korea
Plants described in 1865
Vanilleae